Stephen Michael Edelson is an American autism researcher who has been the director of the Autism Research Institute since 2006.

Biography
Edelson received his master's degree and Ph.D. in experimental psychology from the University of Illinois at Urbana–Champaign. His doctoral advisor there was Douglas Medin. He subsequently joined the faculty of Pitzer College as an assistant professor of psychology. At Pitzer, he helped design the computer program "Miss Stim" to facilitate the education of children with communication disabilities. Before becoming director of the Autism Research Institute, he was the director of the Center for the Study of Autism in Salem, Oregon.

References

21st-century American psychologists
Autism researchers
Experimental psychologists
Living people
Pitzer College faculty
University of Illinois Urbana-Champaign alumni
Year of birth missing (living people)